Bernd Schlufter is a German rower. He won a gold medal at the 1979 World Rowing Championships in Bled with the men's coxed four.

References

Year of birth missing (living people)
East German male rowers
World Rowing Championships medalists for East Germany
Living people